Wen is the pinyin romanisation of the Chinese surname 文 (Wén).

文 (Wén), meaning "literary" or "culture", is usually romanised as Man in Cantonese (most widely used by those from Hong Kong), and sometimes as Mann. In Min (including the Hokkien, Teochew, and Taiwanese dialects), the name is pronounced Boon. In the Hakka, the name can be romanized as Vun or Voon. The Gan dialect transcription for the name is Mun. Other romanizations include Văn in Vietnamese, Moon or Mun (Hangul: 문) in Korean and Bun (Hiragana: ぶん) in Japanese.

Origins
 from Wen (文), the posthumous title of king King Wen of Zhou, father of King Wu of Zhou who established the Western Zhou dynasty
 adopted in place of another surname, Jing (敬) due to a naming taboo, as the latter was part of the name of two royal personages, Jin Gao Zu (called Shi Jingtang, 石敬瑭) and Song Yi Zu (called Zhao Jing, 趙敬). The latter was the grandfather of Zhao Kuangying (known as Emperor Taizu of Song), who established the Song dynasty. 
 from Wen (文), the given name of Tian Wen, also called Lord Mengchang, a prince of Qi, known as one of ‘the four princes’ during the Warring States period
 from the personal name Wen Zi (文子), a general who lived in Wei during the Spring and Autumn period. 
 from the personal name Wen Shu (文叔), the founder of the Xu (许) located in present-day Henan province) during the Western Zhou dynasty.

Notable people named Wen

Historical figures
Wen Zhong (fl. c. 496 BC), advisor in the state of Yue
Wen Ping, military general of the Cao Wei state in the Three Kingdoms period
Wen Chou (died 200), military general under Han dynasty warlord Yuan Shao
Wen Qin (died 257), military general of the Cao Wei state in the Three Kingdoms period
Wen Zhenheng (1585–1645 AD), Ming dynasty painter, scholar
Wen Yanbo (Song dynasty) (1006-1097), politician and calligraphist of Northern Song dynasty
Wen Tianxiang (1236–1283), chancellor of the Southern Song dynasty
Wen Zhengming (1470–1559), Ming dynasty calligrapher
Wen Yang (disambiguation), several people

Other people
Wen Junhui (stage name: Jun), Chinese member of the South Korean boyband Seventeen
Moon Jae-in, 19th president of South Korea
Jennifer Wen, 21st-century professor of engineering and fire research

Fiction
Wen Zhong (Shang dynasty), fiction character from the ancient novel Fengshen Yanyi

References

See also
 Five Great Clans of the New Territories

Chinese-language surnames